Neorthopleura is a genus of checkered beetles in the family Cleridae. There are at least three described species in Neorthopleura.

Species
These three species belong to the genus Neorthopleura:
 Neorthopleura subfasciatum (Chevrolat, 1874)
 Neorthopleura texana (Bland, 1863)
 Neorthopleura thoracica (Say, 1823)

References

Further reading

 
 

Cleridae
Articles created by Qbugbot